Cat Jahnke (Yong-Kee) is a Canadian singer-songwriter. Her song "Apple"  served as the theme song for the NBC web series Ctrl, while her "Happy Song" appeared in an episode of Degrassi: The Next Generation.

Jahnke, along with Darren Johnston, won Best Original Score in the 168 Hour Film Project (2006) for the film Free of Charge. Jahnke's song "None of Those Things" was also a finalist in the 2006 John Lennon Songwriting Contest.

Two of Jahnke's songs were featured in the music video game iDance 2.
Her song "Apple" was also used in the fourth season of the reality show Dance Moms, in the teams group dance.

Discography

2003: Cathartic
2006: None of Those Things
2008: O Night Divine
2010: The Stories Are Taking Their Toll
2019: The Boy, The Girl, The Wolf

References

Canadian singer-songwriters
Living people
Musicians from Winnipeg
Year of birth missing (living people)